Lancelot Layne (died 28 July 1990) was a rapso artist from Trinidad and Tobago.

Biography
Lancelot Layne was born to a Ms. Ethel Strawn (née Serrano) and raised in Gonzales, Trinidad, a village near Port of Spain. He had a start in many local singing shows and showcase forums in and about Trinidad. During his career, he travelled around the world giving lectures and shows at many music institutions and universities, and was one of the first artists to bring the music of Trinidad and Tobago to the rest of the world.

Layne took many trips to Africa, after studying African history. A 1998 United Nations Radio programme described the links between calypso and highlife music, focusing on an exchange of visits between Layne and high life musician Koo Nimo of Ghana. In later years, Layne joined the Orisa faith. He had a son, Brian Llenwyn Layne, and twin daughters, Niasha and Anuska, who are accomplished pannists.

He is often described as being the founder of rapso; his 1970 song "Blow Away" was the first rapso recording, although the term was not coined until 1980. Many of his most remembered songs were not recorded, including the song "Strike Squad", which he composed for his local football team. "Get Off The Radio" was a protest song about the imbalance of radio airplay between local and foreign works.

In 2016 German reissue company Cree Records/Bear Family Records released a comprehensive compilation album of Lancelot Layne's work. The artwork  for the album was done by Trinidad based Painter Peter Doig.

Discography
1971 Afro'dadian/Blow'way Antillana 
1972 Carnival Calypso Hits (LP)
1974 Neo Calypso (LP)
1975 Endless Vibrations/Soul Train 
1975 Dat is Horrors/Kaiso For Mout
1975 Who Could Help Me/Make Life Easy On Me
1976 Yo Tink It Sorf/Chant
1976 Doh Dig No Blues
1977 These Boots Are Made For Walking/If I Were You
1980 Dis Pan Is For You (LP)
1982 Get Off The Radio
2016 Blow'Way (2LP/2CD, Cree Records)

External links 
Lancelot Layne compilation by Cree Records
Lancelot Layne biography by his daughter, Niasha Layne.
Lancelot Layne discography from the Calypso Archives.
Origin of Rapso
UN Radio Programme Wins Award in 1999 New York Festivals from the United Nations website.
The Carnival Story - Calypso Revolution
 
 

20th-century Trinidad and Tobago male singers
20th-century Trinidad and Tobago singers
Rapso
1990 deaths
Year of birth missing